Arrows and Anchors is the fourth and final studio album by the Texas progressive rock band Fair to Midland, released on July 11, 2011, by E1 Music in North America. In Europe, the record was released by Season of Mist the day before. The album was produced, recorded and mixed by Joe Barresi. The record peaked at #65 on the Billboard 200.

Release and promotion
On April 4, the band debuted the album's first single, "Musical Chairs", on the website ArtistDirect.com. It became available on iTunes on April 18. On May 19, the band released the track "Amarillo Sleeps on My Pillow" for free download on their website.

Reception

The album debuted at no. 65 on the U.S. Billboard 200 chart, selling 7,000 copies and marking the band's highest spot on the chart.

Track list

European limited edition and US ITunes bonus track

US ITunes and Official Website Pre-order bonus track

Official Website Pre-order bonus track

The live versions of "Rikki Tikki Tavi" and "Uh-Oh" were also released as B-sides on the digital single "Amarillo Sleeps on My Pillow".

Out takes
No further tracks were recorded for the album, however several songs were considered for the album during pre-production:
 "Bravo Sierra", performed live once in August 2010 at Tree's in Dallas Texas was left out.
 The titles "The Dead Sea", "Ember Rose" and "Babe Ruthe" (reportedly re-titled to "God Save Us") can be seen written on the band's pre-production track list.

Personnel
Fair to Midland
Darroh Sudderth – vocals, banjo on "Amarillo Sleeps on My Pillow"
Cliff Campbell – guitar
Jon Dicken – bass guitar
Matt Langley – keyboards, marxophone
Brett Stowers – drums

Production
Brian Gardner – mastering
Isaac "Eye-Sack" Flores – artwork
Sean Oakley – assistant engineer
Jun Murakawa – assistant engineer
Morgan Stratton – assistant engineer
Joe Barresi – mixed, recorded, producer

Chart position

References

2011 albums
Fair to Midland albums
E1 Music albums
Season of Mist albums
Albums produced by Joe Barresi